Nikolai Dmitrievich Sergeevsky (1849–1908) was a Russian law professor and statesman.

Biography 
Graduate in law of St. Petersburg University; professor of Demidov Lyceum in Yaroslavl, and of criminal law in St. Petersburg University (1882), lecturer in the Military Law Academy.

Publisher and editor of Iuridicheskaia Letopis, 1890–1892; Head of the Section for the Codification of the Fundamental Laws of Finland (1893). Member of the Consultative Board in the Ministry of Justice and editor of Zhurnal Ministerstva Iustitsii (1894).

State Secretary of the Section for Codification of Laws of the Imperial Chancellery (1895).

Works 
 Sergeevskii, N. D. Finland : the question of autonomy and fundamental laws (1911)

1849 births
1908 deaths
Saint Petersburg State University alumni
Russian legal scholars
Russian journalists
Members of the Russian Assembly